This is a list of notable archaeological sites sorted by country and territories.

For one sorted by continent and time period, see the list of archaeological sites by continent and age.

Afghanistan

Aï Khānum
Bagram
Buddhas of Bamiyan
Hadda
Haji Piyada mosque in Balkh
Mes Aynak
Minarets in Ghazni
Mousallah Complex
Surkh Kotal
Takht-i-rustam
Tillya Tepe

Albania

Amantia
Antigonia
Antipatrea (modern Berat)
Apollonia
Buthrotum
Byllis
Dimale
Epidamnos or Dyrrachium (modern Durrës)
Lissos or Lissus (modern Lezhë)
Oricum
Phoenice (modern Finiq)
Scodra (modern Shkodër)

Algeria

Aïn Turk, Bouïra
Altava
Beni Hammad Fort
Bir el Ater
Cirta
Diana Veteranorum
Djémila
Fossatum Africae
Gemellae
Ghoufi
Oricum
Hammam Essalihine
Hippo Regius
Jedars
Lambaesis
Mila, Algeria
Miliana
Partenia
Qalʿat ibn Salama
Roknia
Royal Mausoleum of Mauretania
Tassili n'Ajjer
Tébessa
Timgad
Tipaza
Uzinaza

Argentina

Cueva de las Manos
Piedra Museo
Pucará de Tilcara
Reserva Provincial Castillos de Pincheira
Ruins of Quilmes
Talampaya National Park
Tastil
Tolombón
Aquihuecó

Armenia

Aramus
Areni-1
Baghaberd
Erebuni Fortress
Garni
Kakavaberd
Odzaberd
Zvartnots Cathedral

Australia

Cuddie Springs
Murujuga or Burrup Peninsula
Ngarrabullgan
Keilor archaeological site
Sunbury earth rings
Kow Swamp Archaeological Site
Wurdi Youang
Mount William stone axe quarry
Balls Head Reserve
Cloggs Cave
Gabarnmung
Kutikina Cave
Madjedbebe
Mudgegonga rock shelter
Warratyi
Tarragal Caves

Austria

Burgstallkogel (Sulm valley)
Sandberg Celtic city
Großmugl
Carnuntum
Vindobona
Iuvavum
Flavia Solva
Virunum
Gravesites of Pannonian Avars at Sigleß

Azerbaijan

Gobustan Rock Art Cultural Landscape
Govurqala, Ağdam
Govurqala, Shaki 
Govurqala, Oguz
Govurqala, Nakhchivan
Qabala treasures

Bahrain

Ain Umm Sujoor
Barbar Temple
Dilmun Burial Mounds
Diraz Temple
Khamis Mosque
Qal'at al-Bahrain
Riffa Fort

Bangladesh

Bhitagarh
Choto Katra
Jagaddala
Mahasthangarh
Mainamati
Mosque City of Bagerhat
Noapara-Ishanchandranagar
Somapura Mahavihara
Sonargaon
Wari-Bateshwar ruins

Belgium

Neolithic flint mines of Spiennes
Veldwezelt-Hezerwater

Belize

Altun Ha
Baking Pot
Cahal Pech
Caracol
Cerros
Colha, Belize
Cuello early agricultural site.
Lamanai
Lubaantun
Nim Li Punit
Uxbenka
Xunantunich

Bolivia

 Chiripa
 El Fuerte de Samaipata
 Isla del Sol
 Incallajta
 Iskanwaya
 Puma Punku
 Lukurmata
 Sacambaya
 Alcaya
 Jachaphasa
 Río Lauca Chullpas
 Tiahuanaco also known as Tiwanaku

Bosnia and Herzegovina

 Bijela Tabija
 Butmir
 Daorson
 Delminium
 Desilo
 Mile (Visoko)
 Neolithic site Okolište

Brazil

 Amazon Stonehenge
 Kuhikugu
 Lagoa Santa
 Pedra Furada sites
 Serra da Capivara National Park

Bulgaria

 Abritus
 Aleksandrovo ancient tomb
 Aquae Calidae
 Armira (roman villa)
 Augusta Trayana (roman ruins of modern Stara Zagora)
 Bacho Kiro cave
 Castra Martis
 Dionysopolis
 Develtos
 Diocletianopolis (modern Hisarya)
 Durankulak lake and island (tell)
 Ezero (tell)
 Heraclea Sintica
 Ivanovo Rock-hewn Churches
 Kabyle
 Kaliakra
 Karanovo (tell)
 Kozarnika cave
 Kazanlak Thracian tomb and other notable sites in the region:
 Golyama Arsenalka tomb
 Griffins tomb
 Helvetia tomb
 Ostrusha tomb
 Seutes III tomb
 Shushmanets tomb
 Madara Rider
 Magura Cave
 Maltepe
 Marcianopolis
 Mezek
 Nesebar
 Nicopolis ad Istrum
 Nicopolis ad Nestum
 Novae
 Odessus (modern Varna)
 Oescus
 Perperikon
 Philippopolis (modern Plovdiv):
 Forum
 Library
 Odeon
 Stadium
 Theater
 Domus Eirene
 Gates and walls
 Great Cathedral Basilica
 Small Basilica
 Aqueduct
 Pistiros
 Pliska
 Pomorie Thracian tomb
 Preslav
 Serdika (modern Sofia)
 Church of Saint George, Sofia
 Serdika amphitheatre
 Saint Sophia Church, Sofia
 Serika walls and gates 
 Seuthopolis
 Silistra Roman Tomb
 Solnitsata (tell)
 Sozopol
 Starosel
 Storgosia (modern Pleven)
 Thracian Tomb of Sveshtari
 Tatul
 Varna Necropolis
 Yunatsite (tell)

Burkina Faso
Ancient Ferrous Metallurgy Sites of Burkina Faso
Ruins of Loropéni

Cambodia

Siemreap:
Angkor City covers a large portion of Siemreap
Ak Yum
Angkor Thom
Baphuon
Bayon
Khleangs North
Khleangs South
Phimeanakas
Prasat Suor Prat – 12 towers
Preah Palilay
Preah Pithu 
Terrace of the Elephants
Terrace of the Leper King
Angkor Wat
Baksei Chamkrong
Banteay Kdei
Banteay Samre
Banteay Srei
Bat Chum
Beng Mealea
Chau Say Tevoda
East Baray
East Mebon
Kbal Spean – riverbed/underwater carvings
Neak Pean
Phnom Bakheng
Phnom Bok
Phnom Kulen
Phnom Krom
Pre Rup
Preah Khan
Roluos
Bakong
Lolei
Preah Ko
Spean Thma
Ta Nei
Ta Prohm
Ta Som
Thommanon
West Baray
West Mebon
Kampong Cham:
Banteay Prei Nokor
Kampong Thom:
Prasat Phum Prasat
Sambor Prei Kuk
Kandal:
Oudong a.k.a. Phnom Preah Reach Top
Preah Vihear:
Wat Phnom
Wat Ounalom
Koh Ker
Preah Ponlea a.k.a. Palais or Prasat Srot
Preah Khan Kompong Svay a.k.a. Preah Bakan
Preah Vihear
Battambang:
Wat Ek Phnom
Takeo:
Angkor Borei
Phnom Chiso

Canada

Bluefish Caves
Brooman Point Village, Nunavut
Debert, Nova Scotia
Harrison Hill (Qithyll)
Head-Smashed-In Buffalo Jump
Keatley Creek Archaeological Site
Kitigaaryuit
Kitwanga Fort
L'Anse aux Meadows
Mantle site
Native Point
Ovayok Territorial Park
Petroglyph Provincial Park, Nanaimo, BC
Petroglyphs Provincial Park, Ontario
Pointe-à-Callière, Montréal, QC
Secwepemc Museum and Heritage Park (Kamloops BC)
SG̱ang Gwaay (Ninstints)
Sheguiandah
Skedans (Koona, K'uuna Llnagaay)
Southwold Earthworks
St. Mary Reservoir, Alberta
Strathcona Science Provincial Park
təmtəmíxʷtən/Belcarra Regional Park
Turtle Mountain Provincial Park
Wanuskewin Heritage Park
Whiteshell Provincial Park
X̱á:ytem (Hatzic Rock)

Chile

Easter Island:
Rano Raraku
Orongo Village
Monte Verde
Fell Cave
Pali Aike
Pucarás:
Quitor
Camiña
Tulor
Chan-Chan

China

An Yang
Banpo, a Neolithic site
Bashidang
Chang'an, an ancient capital
Chengtoushan
Daming Palace National Heritage Park
Gallery road
Huoluochaideng, city-site with mints and coin-hoards
Jiahu
Lajia
Peking Man, site at Zhoukoudian near Beijing
Sanxingdui
Terracotta Army, near Xian
Tianlongshan Grottoes
Museum of the Mausoleum of the Nanyue King, Guangzhou
Yinxu

Colombia

San Agustín archeological park
National Archeological Park of Tierradentro
Ciudad Perdida, in the Sierra Nevada de Santa Marta
Malagana
El Abra, Bogotá. Muisca early animal domestication site
Puerto Hormiga archaeological site
Villa de Leyva. El Infiernito archaeological site
El morro del tulcán

Costa Rica
 Guayabo

Croatia

 Aquae Iasae
 Burnum
 Monkodonja
 Narona
 Nesactium
 Pula Arena
 Starčevo culture
 Stari Grad Plain

Cyprus

 Antiphonitis
 Enkomi
 Idalium
 Khirokitia
 Klimonas
 Kykkos Monastery
 Notre Dame de Tyre
 Panagia Apsinthiotissa
 Paphos
 Pyla-Kokkinokremnos
 Salamis

Czech Republic
Mladec (Mladeč) – Homo 31.000 years ago
Dolni Vestonice settlement

Denmark

Aggersborg
Fyrkat
Klekkende Høj
Lindholm Høje
Randlev and Hesselbjerg
Skuldelev ships

Ecuador

Agua Blanca
Ingapirca
Tumebamba
Valdivia
Cochasquí

Egypt

Amarna
Colossi of Memnon
Deir el-Medina
Deir el-Bahri
Edfu
Esna
Giza
Heliopolis
Karnak Temple
Kom Ombo Temple
Luxor Temple
Oxyrhynchus
Philae
Ramesseum
Tanis
Valley of the Kings
Ismailia Canal

El Salvador
Cara Sucia
Joya de Cerén
Quelepa
San Andrés
Tazumal

Eritrea
Gash Group
Buya
Metera
Qohayto
Keskese
Adulis
Mendefera
Sembel

Estonia
Pulli settlement
Rebala

Ethiopia
Hadar, Ethiopia
Omo remains
Mifsas Bahri
Bouri Formation

Finland
Astuvansalmi
Ukonkivi
Wolf Cave

France
Grotte du Vallonnet
Terra Amata
Chauvet Cave
Lascaux
Glanum
Glozel
Carnac Stones

Georgia 
 Armazi
 Dmanisi
 Nokalakevi
 Vani

Germany
 Aythra
 Bilzingsleben
 Hirschlanden
 Königsaue
 Pfahlbau Museum Unteruhldingen
 Federsee

Greece

 Acharnae, Athens ( Mycenaean tomb)

Aegina (Temple of Aphaea, Temple of Zeus), Attica
Aigeira, West Greece
Aigosthena, Attica
Akraiphnion, Central Greece
Akrotiri at Santorini, South Aegean
Alifeira, West Greece
Amphiareion of Oropos, Attica
Amphipolis, Central Macedonia
Amykles (ancient Amyclae), Peloponnese
Anafi, South Aegean
Anastasioupolis-Peritheorion, Thrace
Anemospilia, Crete
Anthidona, Central Greece
Antissa, Lesbos, North Aegean
Aptera, Crete
Archanes – Vathypetro, Crete
Argos, Peloponnese
Arisbe, Lesbos, North Aegean
Armeni, Minoan Tombs, Crete
Arta – Ambracia, Epirus
Asclepieion of Kos, South Aegean
Asea, Peloponnese
Asini, Peloponnese
Assiros, Central Macedonia
Central Athens (Odeon of Herodes Atticus, Acropolis, Kerameikos, Pnyx, Colonus, Areopagus, Kallimarmaro Stadium, Temple of Olympian Zeus, Temple of Hephaestus, Ancient Agora of Athens, Roman Forum, Theatre of Dionysus)
Abdera, Thrace, East Macedonia and Thrace
Avlida, Central Greece
Bassae, Peloponnese
Brauron, Attica
Calydon, West Greece
Cathrea at Kea, South Aegean
Cassiope, Corfu, Ionian Islands
Cassiope, Epirus
Chaeronea, Central Greece
Chalcis, Central Greece
Chios (Temple of Apollo at Phana), North Aegean
Kleonae, Peloponnese
Corfu, Ionian Islands
Corinth, Peloponnese
Cynosura at Salamis, Attica
Delium, Central Greece
Delphi, Central Greece
Delos, South Aegean
Dimini, Thessaly
Dion, Central Macedonia
Dispilio, West Macedonia
Dodona, Epirus
Dorio, Peloponnese
Drapetsona, Athens, Attica
Dreros, Crete
Dystos, Central Greece
Eadion at Salamis, Attica
Eani, West Macedonia
Edessa, Central Macedonia
Eleusis, West Attica
Elis, West Greece
Elyros, Crete
Epitalion, West Greece
Eresos, Lesbos, North Aegean
Eretria, Central Greece
Eretria, Thessaly
Ephyra, Epirus
Epidaurus (A'Theatre, B'Theatre and Asclepieion Sites), Peloponnese
Eupalinian aqueduct of Samos, North Aegean
Estavromenou Square, Aigaleo, Athens
Evropos, Central Macedonia
Figaleia, West Greece
Fthiotides Thivae, Thessaly
Gioura, Alonissos, Thessaly
Gomfoi, Thessaly
Goniae, Crete
Gortyn, Crete
Gournia, Crete
Gynaecokastron, Central Macedonia
Gythium, Peloponnese
Hellenikon, Greek Pyramid in Hellenikon, Athens
Hephaestia, Lemnos, North Aegean
Hagia Triada, Crete
Heraion of Argos, Peloponnese
Heraion of Samos, Samos, North Aegean
Ialysos at Rhodes, South Aegean
Ierapetra and Vasiliki, Crete
Isthmia, Peloponnese
Ios, South Aegean
Itanos and Palekastro, Crete
Ithaca, Ionian Islands
Ithomi, Peloponnese
Kalymnos, South Aegean
Kameiros at Rhodes, South Aegean
Kallithea (Temple of Ammon Zeus), Central Macedonia
Karfi (Karphi), Crete
Kastron, Central Greece
Kato Choa, Kythira, Attica
Kaveirion, Lemnos, North Aegean
Kavousi Kastro, Crete
Kavousi Vronda, Crete
Kechries, Peloponnese
Kifissia (Roman Tomb monument near Platanou Square), Athens. 
Kionia at Tinos, South Aegean
Kleitor, West Greece
Knossos, Crete
Kolchis, Central Macedonia
Kos, South Aegean
Kydonia, Crete
Kyparissia, Peloponnese
Lakereia, Thessaly
Larissa, Thessaly
Lato, Crete
Lavrio, Attica
Lefkadia, Central Macedonia
Lefkandi, Central Greece
Lefkopetra, Central Macedonia
Lentas, Crete
Lepreum, West Greece
Lerna, Peloponnese
Lindos, Rhodes Island, South Aegean
Linos, East Macedonia and Thrace
Lissos, Crete
Loukous, Herodes Atticus Villa, Peloponnese
Lycaeon, Peloponnese
Lyctus, Crete
Lycosura, Peloponnese
Macedonian Tombs at N.Nicomedia, Central Macedonia
Magasa, Crete
Malia, Crete
Mantineia, Peloponnese
Marathon (or Marathonas), Attica
Maroneia, East Macedonia and Thrace
Matala and Kommos, Crete
Megalopolis, Peloponnese
Megara, Attica
Menelaeon, Peloponnese
Mesemvria, East Macedonia and Thrace
Midea and Dendra, Peloponnese
Milos, South Aegean
Minia, Kefalonia, Ionian Islands
Minoa at Amorgos, South Aegean
Mochlos, Crete
Monemvasia, Peloponnese
Mount Athos
Mount Juktas, Crete
Mycenae, Peloponnese
Myrina, Lesbos, North Aegean
Myrtos Pyrgos, Crete
Mystras, Peloponnese
Mytilene, Lesbos, North Aegean
Naousa, Central Macedonia
Nape (Temple of Apollo), Lesbos, North Aegean
Naupactus and Makyneia, West Greece
Naxos (Ancient Naxos and Kouros Sites), South Aegean
Necromanteion of Acheron, Epirus
Nemea, Peloponnese
Nicopolis, Epirus
Nymphasia, Peloponnese
Oiniades, West Greece
Olous, Crete
Olympia, West Greece
Olynthus, Central Macedonia
Orchomenus, Central Greece
Orchomenus, Peloponnese
Pagasae, Thessaly
Palace of Nestor, Peloponnese
Palaiopoli at Andros, South Aegean
Paleopochora, Kythira, Attica
Paleopolis at Kythira, Attica
Panormos at Mykonos, South Aegean
Paros (Ancient Paros and Delion Sites), South Aegean
Partira, Crete
Patras, West Greece
Pella, Central Macedonia
Perachora (Heraion), Peloponnese
Perrevia, Leivadi, Thessaly
Petrae, West Macedonia
Phalasarna, Crete
Phanarion, East Macedonia and Thrace
Phanariion at Icaria, North Aegean
Phaistos, Crete
Pharsala, Thessaly
Pheneos, Peloponnese
Philippi, East Macedonia and Thrace
Phourni, Crete
Piraeus, Athens
Plevrona, West Greece
Poseidi, (Temple of Poseidon), Central Macedonia
Poliochne, Lemnos, North Aegean
Poikilassos, Crete
Polyrrinia, Crete
Lefkada (city), Lefkada, Ionian Islands
Limnea – Amphilochia, West Greece
Plataies, Central Greece
Poseidonia and Chalandriani at Syros, South Aegean
Potidaea, Central Macedonia
Praessus, Crete
Pydna, Central Macedonia
Pylos, Peloponnese
Pyrassos – Nea Anchialos, Thessaly
Pyrgos, Central Greece
Pythagoreion of Samos, Samos, North Aegean
Roman Aqueduct of Louros, Epirus
Rhamnus, Attica
Rhodes (Ancient and Walled City of Rhodes), South Aegean
Samikon, West Greece
Samothrace Temple complex (Sanctuary of the Great Gods), East Macedonia and Thrace
Serres, Central Macedonia
Servia, West Macedonia
Sesklo, Thessaly
Sicyon, Peloponnese
Sikinos, South Aegean
Sitagroi, East Macedonia and Thrace
Skillounta and Iardanos Tombs, West Greece
Sounion, Attica
Sparta, Peloponnese
Spilia, West Greece
Stratos, West Greece
Stymphalia, Peloponnese
Syia, Crete
Tanagra, Central Greece
Tarra, Crete
Tegea, Peloponnese
Thasos, East Macedonia and Thrace
Thebes, Central Greece
Thermon, West Greece
Thermopylae, Central Greece
Thermos, West Greece
Thespiae, Central Greece
Thessaloniki, Central Macedonia
Thira, South Aegean
Thisbe, Central Greece
Tiryns, Peloponnese
Thermae of Traianopolis, East Macedonia and Thrace
Toroni, Central Macedonia
Trikke, Thessaly
Troezen, Attica
Trophoniou Oracle at Livadeia, Central Greece
Tylissos, Crete
Vapheion, Peloponnese
Vanaena, Peloponnese
Vergina (Macedonian Tombs complex), Central Macedonia
Vistonis, East Macedonia and Thrace
 Vravrona, Attica Region 
Vrisa, Lesbos, North Aegean
Yrtakina, Crete
Zakros, Crete

Guatemala

 Aguateca
 La Amelia
 Balberta
 El Baúl
 Bejucal (Mesoamerican site)
 Bilbao (Mesoamerican site)
 La Blanca, Peten
 Cancuén
 El Chal
 Chitinamit
 Chocolá
 Chojolom
 Cival
 Dos Pilas
 Holmul
 Holtun
 Itzan
 Iximché
 Ixkun
 Ixlu
 Ixtonton
 Ixtutz
 La Joyanca
 Kaminaljuyu
 Kinal
 Machaquila
 El Mirador
 Mixco Viejo
 Montana (Mesoamerican site)
 Monte Alto culture
 Motul de San José
 La Muerta
 Naachtun
 Nakbe
 Nakum
 Naranjo
 Nebaj
 Pajaral
 El Perú (Maya site)
 El Pilar
 El Porvenir (Maya site)
 Punta de Chimino
 Quiriguá
 Q'umarkaj
 Río Azul
 Sacul, El Petén
 San Bartolo (Maya site)
 San Mateo Ixtatán
 Seibal
 La Sufricaya
 Takalik Abaj
 Tamarindito
 Tayasal (archaeological site)
 El Temblor
 Tikal
 El Tintal
 Topoxté
 Tres Islas
 Uaxactún
 Ucanal
 Ujuxte
 Witzna
 Xultún
 Yaxha
 Zacpeten
 Zaculeu
 Zapote Bobal
 El Zotz

Honduras
Copán
El Puente

Hong Kong
Lei Cheng Uk Han Tomb
Stone Circles
Wong Tei Tung, Late Palaeolithic

Hungary
 Aquincum
 Gorsium
 Üllő5

India

Ajanta Caves
Adichanallur
Adi Badri, Haryana
Attirampakkam
Alamgirpur
Assandh
Ambadevi rock shelters
Acheulean, site of Chirki-on-Pravara
Adichanallur
Aihole
Arikamedu
Babar Kot
Badami
Balu, Kaithal
Bhagatrav
Banawali
Bargaon (archaeological site)
Bet Dwarka
Baror
Bairat Temple
Barabar Caves, oldest Rock-cut cave of India
Bhimbetka
Birhana
Bodh Gaya
Bodh Stupa
Burzahom archaeological site
Chaneti Buddhist Stupa
Chirand
Deopahar
Daimabad
Desalpar Gunthli
Doiyang Dhansiri Valley
Dholavira, ancient metropolitan city
Edakkal Caves, possible influence of Indus Valley Civilization in Kerala
Elephanta Caves
Ellora Caves
Farmana
Great Living Chola Temples
Gola Dhoro
Ganweriwal
Hampi
Hulas
Hastinapur
Harsh Ka Tila
Iron Pillar of Delhi, pillar without any corrosion standing from 400 AD
Jaugada, Mauryan fort site
Jognakhera
Jorwe
Jwalapuram
Kalibangan
Kanchipuram
Kagarol
Kaj
Kanjetar
Karanpura
Keezhadi excavation site
Khirasara
Kuntasi
Kerala-no-dhoro
Kunal
Kharligarh, ancient ruined fort
Konark Sun Temple
Kumashpur
Khujaraho
Konark Sun Temple
Krimchi temples, Pandava Temples
Kulpahar, site of 10th century remains
Lothal
Nalanda, largest university of ancient time and one of the oldest
Mahaballipuram
Manda,Jammu
Mandi, Uttar Pradesh
Masrur Temples
Meenakshi Temple
Pattadakal
Pandu Rajar Dhibi
Pattanam (South India)
Qutub Minar
Rakhigarhi
Rock edicts of Khalsi
Rewari, site of a large hoard of copper artefacts
Sanchi
Sisupalgarh, Mauryan fort site
Sugh Ancient Mound
Sinauli
Sujata Stupa
Sivasagar
Surkotada
Thanjavur, important center of South Indian religion, art, and architecture. Most of the Great Living Chola Temples
Tiruchirappalli
Topra Kalan
Unakoti
Udayagiri Caves
Vaishali
Vikramshila

Indonesia

Batujaya Archaeological Site
Borobudur
Bukit Kerang
Gunung Padang Megalithic Site
Pugung Raharjo
Sangiran
Trowulan
Trinil

Iran

 *Alamut
 *Apadana
 *Arg-é Bam
 *Bishapur
 *Blue Mosque, Tabriz
 *Damghan
 *Darband Cave
 *Ecbatana
 *Firuzabad
 *Ganj Par
 *Ganj Dareh
 *Golestan Palace
 *Hajji Firuz Tepe
 *Izadkhvast
 *Silk Road
 *Taq-e Bostan
 *Teppe Hasanlu
 *Jameh Mosque of Isfahan
 *Jondi Shapur
 *Ka'ba-i Zartosht
 *Kashafrud
 *Kunji Cave
 *Masuleh
 *Meybod
 *Naqsh-e Rajab
 *Naqsh-e Rostam
 *Pasargadae
 *Persepolis
 *Qaleh Bozi Caves
 *Rabat Tepe
  Shahdad Kerman
 *Shahr-e Sukhteh
 *Soltaniyeh
 *Susa
 *Takht-i-Suleiman
 *Warwasi
     Aamaj Castle
     Ali Kosh
     Ali-Sadr Cave
     Anshan (Persia)
     Anubanini rock relief
     Asaak
     Bābā Jān Tepe
     Bandar Siraf
     Bandian Fire Temple
     Banesh
     Bardak Siah Palace
     Barm-e Delak
     Bastam Citadel
     Behistun Inscription
     Bisitun Cave
     Bit-Istar
     Boz Dam
     Chia Jani
     Chogha Bonut
     Chogha Golan
     Chogha Mish
     Chogha Zanbil
     Coronation of Ardashir II
     Darband Cave
     Darreh Shahr Ancient City
     Dekhmeh Rawansar
     Do-Ashkaft Cave
     Ecbatana
     Elamite rock relief in Naqsh-e Rostam
     Eshkaft-e Salman
     Eshkaft-e Siahoo
     Essaqwand Rock Tombs
     Fakhrigah
     Farhād Tarāsh
     Ganj Dareh
     Ganj Par
     Geoy Tepe
     Gerdkooh Hills
     Ghar-e-Pariyan
     Godin Tepe
     Great Hagi Jaffar Dam
     Great Wall of Gorgan
     Haft Tepe
     Hajji Firuz Tepe
     Hilleh Historical Village
     Huto and Kamarband Caves
     Istakhr
     Jiroft
     Kalahrod
     Kashafrud
     Kebar Dam
     Kelar Mound
     Khanileh, Kermanshah
     Kharg Island
     Khorramabad
     Khosrow parviz hunting ground
     Khosrowabad Castle
     Konar Sandal
     Kul Tepe Jolfa
     Kul-e Farah
     Kurit Dam
     List of paintings and plots by Pascal Coste and Eugène Flandin
     Marlik
     Matiene
     Mount Behistun
     Mount Khajeh
     Nakhcheer
     Naqsh-e Rustam
     Nishapur
     Noushijan Tappe
     Palace of Darius in Susa
     Paraw Kukherd
     Pasargadae
     Persepolis
     Poshtab Castle
     Prehistory of Iran
     Qadamgah (ancient site)
     Qahqaheh Castle
     Qaleh Bozi
     Qiblah Mosque
     Rab'-e Rashidi
     Rabat Tepe
     Sidekan
     Rahmatabad Mound
     Saltmen
     Sang-i Chakmak
     Sari, Iran
     Sefid-Ab
     Shadiyakh
     Shah Tepe
     Shahr-e Sukhteh
     Shir Ashian Tepe
     Siba Castle
     Sorkh Deh chamber tomb
     Statue of Hercules
     Tabriz
     Tachara
     Takht-e Soleymān
     Tall-i Bakun
     Tangeh Bolaghi
     Taq Bostan
     Taq-e Gara
     Tawseelah Castle
     Tehran Plain
     Temukan
     Tepe Hissar
     Tepe Sialk
     Tepe Yahya
     Teppe Hasanlu
     Teppe Zagheh
     Terenah
     The Historic Bath of Siba
     Tureng Tepe
     Two domes of Kukherd
     Warwasi
     Wezmeh
     Yafteh
     Yarim Tepe (Iran)
     Zayandeh River Culture
     Ziwiye hoard

Iraq

Al-Mada'in (Taq-i Kisra's ruins)
Al-Qurnah
Babylon
Baghdad
Bakr Awa
Ginnig
Gird-î Qalrakh
Hatra
Idu
Isin
Jarmo
M'lefaat
Mardaman
Nemrik 9
Nimrud
Nineveh
Puzrish-Dagan
Samarra
Shanidar
Tell Abada
Tell al-Fakhar
Tell Bazmusian
Tell Begum
Tell el-'Oueili
Tell Madhur
Tell Rashid
Tell Shemshara
Ur

Republic of Ireland

Dowth
Grianan of Aileach
Hill of Tara
Innisfallen Abbey
Kilcrea Friary
Knowth
Monasterboice
Newgrange
Trim Castle
Carrowmore
Miosgán Medhbh
Skellig Michael

Israel

Antipatris
Arsuf (Apollonia)
Ashkelon
Avdat
Arbel
Atlit fortress
Anim
Bar'am Synagogue
Beit Alpha
Beit Guvrin
Bethsaida
Beth Shean (Scythopolis)
Beth She'arim
Belvoir Fortress
Caesarea Maritima
Capernaum
Chorazin
Ein Hemed
Ein Gedi
Ekron
Et-Tell
Gezer
Gibeon
Hamat Tiberias
Haluza
Hebron
Herodium
Hippos
Tell es-Sultan (Jericho)
Hisham's Palace
Jerusalem (Western Wall Tunnel, City of David, Pool of Bethesda, Southern Wall excavations and its Jerusalem pilgrim road and many more in the Old City of Jerusalem and outside the old city...)
Khirbat al-Minya
Khirbet al-Ra’i
Khirbet Kerak
Khirbet Qeiyafa
Lachish
Laura of Euthymius
Magdala
Mamshit
Masada
Mount Gerizim
Monastery of Martyrius
Montfort (castle)
Neve David
Nahal Me'arot Nature Reserve
Qesem Cave
Qumran
Ramat Rahel
Safed
Sebastia
Shivta
Shuqba cave
Solomon's Pools
Susiya
White Mosque (Ramla)
Tell Abu Hawam
Tel Arad
Tell Balata
Tel Be'er Sheva
Tel Dan
Tell el-Hesi
Tel Hazor
Tel Megiddo
Tel Michal
Tel Shilo
Tel Shikmona
Temple Mount
Timnah
Tomb of Samuel
Sepphoris
Ubeidiya
Yavneh-Yam
Yodfat

Italy

Agrigento
Agrigentum
Alba Fucens
Amiternum
Asti
Brescia
Calabria
Campania
Catania
Caulonia
Corfinium
Croton
Erice
Forum Romanum
Forlì – Monte Poggiolo
Giardini Naxos
Herculaneum
Isernia La Pineta
Juvanum
Lazio
Locri
Lucus Angitiae
Mount Bibele
Morgantina
Mozia
Necropolis of Anghelu Ruju
Necropolis of Fossa
Necropolis of Li Muri
Nola-Croce del Papa
Ocriticum
Ostia Antica
Paestum
Palmi
Peltuinum
Piemonte
Pompeii
Rome
Rhegion
Sardinia
Saepinum
Sassi of Matera
Segesta
Selinunte
Shrine of Hercules Curinus
Sibari
Sicily
Siracusa
Suasa
Su Nuraxi di Barumini
Taormina
Tauriana
Turin
Tusculum
Trapani
Val Camonica
Villa Romana del Casale
Veleia, Piacenza

Japan

Fukui cave
Ichijōdani Asakura Family Historic Ruins
Iwajuku
Sannai-Maruyama
Senpukuji Cave
Yoshinogari

Jordan

'Ain Ghazal
Jerash
Madaba mosaic map
Petra
Umm Qais
Qasr Azraq
Ajlun Castle
Pella (Tabqet Fahl)
Philadelphia (Amman): Roman Amphitheatre and castle
Barashta
Capitolias (Beit Ras)
Irbid (el tal)
Umm el-Jimal

Kazakhstan

Issyk kurgan
Otrar
Petrovka settlement
Türkistan

Korea
 
Anak Tomb No. 3
Bangudae Petroglyphs
Igeum-dong

Kyrgyzstan

Balasagun
Burana
Issyk Kul
Qoshoy Qorgon
Suyab
Tash Rabat
Uzgen

Kuwait
Agarum
Bahra 1
H3 (Kuwait)

Lebanon

Sidon
Tyre
Aadloun
Anjar, Lebanon
Aaiha
Aammiq
Aaqbe
Afqa
Ain Aata
Ain Harcha
Akbiyeh
Akkar plain foothills
Al-Bireh, Rashaya
Amioun
Amlaq Qatih
Anjar, Lebanon
Antelias cave
Ard Saouda
Ard Tlaili
Arqa
Arsal
At Tiri
Baalbek
Baidar ech Chamout
Bakka, Lebanon
Batroumine
Bechamoun
Beit Mery
Bodai
Canalizations of Zenobia
Cardo Decumanus Crossing
Colonnaded Street
Bustan Birke
Dahr El Ahmar
Dakoue
Darbechtar
Deir El Aachayer
Deir el Ahmar
Dekwaneh
Douwara
Duris, Lebanon
Flaoui
Jabal es Saaïdé
Jbaa
Jdeideh
Jebel Aabeby
Jeita Grotto
Joub Jannine
Kafr Zabad
Kamid al lawz
Kamouh el Hermel
Karak Nuh
Kaukaba
Kefraya
Kfar Abida
Kfar Qouq
Kfar Tebnit
Kfarhata
Khallet el Hamra
Khallet Michte
Khirbet El-Knese
Ksar Akil
Labweh
Lake Qaraoun
Libbaya
Lion Tower
Majdal Anjar
Mansourieh
Maqne
Maronite mummies
Mayrouba
Mdoukha
Monastery of Saint Maron
Moukhtara
Mtaileb
Nabi Zair
Nachcharini
Nahle, Lebanon
Neba'a Faour
Nebi Safa
Niha Bekaa
Ourrouar
Qaa
Qal'at Bustra
Qalaat Faqra
Qalaat Tannour
Qaraoun
Qasr Chbib
Qasr el Banat, Lebanon
Ras al-Ain, Lebanon
Ras Baalbek I
Ras Beirut
Ras El Kelb
Rashaya
Riha Station
Riyaq
Rmeileh
Sands of Beirut
Saraain El Faouqa
Sarepta
Sawiri, Lebanon
Shheem
Sidon
Sin el Fil
Tahun ben Aissa
Tayibe (Lebanon)
Tell Aalaq
Tell Ain Cerif
Tell Ain el Meten
Tell Ain Ghessali
Tell Ain Nfaikh
Tell Ain Saouda
Tell Ayoub
Tell Deir
Tell Delhamieh
Tell Derzenoun
Tell Dibbine
Tell Ed Deir
Tell El Ghassil
Tell el-Burak
Tell Hoch Rafqa
Tell Jezireh
Tell Jisr
Tell Karmita
Tell Khardane
Tell Kirri
Tell Mekhada
Tell Mureibit
Tell Neba'a Chaate
Tell Neba'a Litani
Tell Qasr Labwe
Tell Rasm El Hadeth
Tell Rayak
Tell Shaikh Hassan al Rai
Tell Shamsine
Tell Zeitoun
Tell Zenoub
Temnin el-Foka
Temple of Eshmun
Toron
Tyre Hippodrome
Tyre Necropolis
Tyre, Lebanon
Wadi Koura
Wadi Yaroun
Yammoune
Yanta, Lebanon
Ain W Zain
Zahlé

Libya

Leptis Magna
Cyrene
Apollonia
Sabratha
Tripoli Medina
Germa
Derna Medina
Ghadames Medina
Benghazi Ottoman Palace
Waddan Fortress
Tolmeita
Knightsbridge War Cemetery
 Stone art of Tadrart Acacus
Giarabub
Oea
Marmarica
Kyrenaika

Malaysia

Niah Caves
Kota Tampan
Lenggong
Bujang Valley
Sungai Batu

Mali
Timbuktu
Djenne

Malta
Clapham Junction – cart ruts
Ġgantija Temples – listed as a UNESCO World Heritage Site
Ħaġar Qim Temples – listed as a UNESCO World Heritage Site
Hypogeum of Ħal-Saflieni – prehistoric subterranean structure listed as a UNESCO World Heritage Site
Mnajdra Temples – listed as a UNESCO World Heritage Site
Tarxien Temples – listed as a UNESCO World Heritage Site
Xagħra Stone Circle

Mexico
See also: List of archaeological sites in Mexico City

Acaneh
Acanmul
Achiutla
Acozac (archaeological site)
Ake
Almuchil
Altar de los Reyes
Altavista petroglyph complex
Anayte'
El Amparo
El Arbolillo
El Azuzul
Balakbal
Balamku
Balankanche
Balcón de Montezuma
Becan
Bellote
Bolonchén
Bonampak
Cacaxtla
Calakmul
Calixtlahuaca
Calotmul
La Campana (archaeological site)
Candelaria Cave
Cansacbe
Cantona (Mesoamerican site)
Cañada de la Virgen
Capacha
Casa de la Cacica
Castillo de Teayo (Mesoamerican site)
Cempoala
Cenotillo
El Cerrito (archaeological site)
Cerro de la Estrella (archeological site)
Cerro de las Mesas
Cerro de las Minas
Cerro Juanaqueña
Chac II
Chacchoben
Chacmultun
Chactun
Chakalal
Chakanbakan
Chalcatzingo
Chalchihuites
El Chanal
Chiapa de Corzo (Mesoamerican site)
Chicanna
Chichen Itza
Chichmul
El Chicozapote
Chimalhuacán (archaeological site)
Chinikiha
Chinkultic
Cholula (Mesoamerican site)
Chuctiepa
Chunchucmil
Chunhuhub
Chunlimon
Chunkunab
Chupicuaro
Coatetelco
Coba
Comalcalco
Comitan
El Conde
El Coporo
Cozumel
Cuajilote
Cuarenta Casas
Cuauhtinchan
Cuca
Cueva de las Jarillas
Cueva De Las Ventanas
Cueva de Oxtotitlan
Cuicuilco
Culuba
Cutzamala (Mesoamerican site)
Cuyuxquihui
Dainzú
Dzehkabtun
Dzekilna
Dzibanche
Dzibilchaltun
Dzibilnocac
Dzibiltun
Dzilam
Dzitbalche
Dzula
Edzna
Ek' Balam
El Encanto
Etlatongo
La Ferreria
Flor de Mayo
Frightful Cave
Gheo-shih
Guachimontones
Guaquitepec
Guiengola
Hacienda Hotzuc
Halakal
Halal
Haltunchon
Hoboyna
Hochop
Holactun
Hormiguero
Hotzuc
Huamango
Huamelulpan (archaeological site)
Huandacareo
Huapalcalco
Huápoca
Huatusco (archaeological site)
Hunanhil
Huntichmul
Huntichmul II
Ichkabal
Ichmac
Ichmul
Ichpaatun
Ichpich
Los Idolos
Ihuatzio
Ikil (Maya site)
Isla de Jaina
Isla de Piedras
Isla Uaymil
Itzamkanac
Ixcateopan
Ixil
Ixtelha
Ixtlan del Rio (archaeological site)
Izamal
Izapa
Jolja'
Jonuta
La Joya
Juxtlahuaca
Kabah (Maya site)
Kana
Kanki
Kinich
Kakmo
Kintunich
Kantunil Kin
Kayal
Kiuic
Kohunlich
Komchen
Kukab
Kuluba
Labna
Lacanha
Laguna de los Cerros
Lambityeco
Loltun
Las Bocas
Las Choapas
Las Flores (archaeological site)
Las Ranas
Malpasito
Managua (Maya site)
El Manatí
Mani
La Mar
Mario Ancona (Maya site)
Matacapan
Maxcanu
Mayapan
El Meco
Mesa de Cacahuatenco
Miraflores
Misantla
Mitla
Mocu
La Mojarra
Monte Albán
Mopila
Moral Reforma
Mul chic
Muluch Tsekal
La Muñeca
Muyil
Nakaskat
Ndaxagua
Nicolas Bravo (Maya site)
Nocuchich
Nohpat
Ojo de Agua (Maya site)
Okop
El Opeño
Organera Xochipala
Otompan
Oxcutzcab
Oxkintok
Oxlahuntun
Oxpemul
Oxtankah
Oxtotitlán
El Pabellon
Padre Piedra
Palace of Cortés, Cuernavaca
Palenque
El Palmar (Chiapas)
El Palmar (Quintana Roo)
El Palmillo
Panhale
Paquime
Paso de la Amada
Pechal
Peralta (Mesoamerican site)
Pestac
Piedra Labrada
La Pintada (archaeological site)
El Pital (Veracruz)
Pixoy
Plazuelas
Pomoná
Pomuch
Potonchán
La Proveedora
Punta Sur (Cozumel)
Puuc
La Quemada
Quiahuiztlan
El Quirambal
Remojadas
El Resbalon
El Retiro
El Rey
Río Bec
Río Michol
Sabacche
Sabakalal
Sacchana
San Andrés (Mesoamerican site)
San Claudio (Maya site)
Sacnicte
San Gervasio (Maya site)
San José Mogote
San Lorenzo (Campeche)
San Lorenzo (Chiapas)
San Lorenzo Tenochtitlán
San Miguel Ixtapan (archaeological site)
San Pablo Huitzo
Santa Cecilia Acatitlan
Santa Elena (Maya site)
Santa Rosa Xtampak
Santoton
Sayil
Sihó
Silvituc
Simojovel
Sisilha
La Soledad de Maciel
Suchilquitongo (archaeological site)
T'Ho
El Tabasqueño
Tabi
El Tajín
Tamaulipas early agricultural site.
Tancah
Tapachula
Techoh
Tecoaque
Telantunich
Templo Mayor
Tenam Puente
Tenam Rosario
Tenayuca
Tenochtitlan
Teopantecuanitlan
Teopanzolco
Teotenango
Teotihuacan
Tepatlaxco (Mesoamerican site)
Tepcatan
Tepeticpac
Los Tepoltzis
El Tepozteco
El Teul
Tila
Tingambato
Tipikal
Tizatlan
Tlapacoya
Tlatelolco
Tlatilco
Tohcok
Tollan
Tonalá
Toniná
Tortuguero (Maya site)
Tres Zapotes
Tula
Tulum
Tunkuyi
Tututepec
Tzendales
Tzibanche
Tzintzuntzan (Mesoamerican site)
Tzocchen
Tzum
Uaymil
Uci (Maya site)
Uitzina
Ukum
La Union
Uxmal
El Vallecito
La Venta
Xaltocan
Xbalche
Xcalumkin
Xcambo
Xcaret
Xcocha
Xcochkax
Xcoh
Xcorralche
Xcucsuc
Xculoc
Xel Ha
Xicalango
Xkalachetzimin
Xkichmook
Xkipche
Xkombec
Xkukican
Xlapak
Xnucbec
Xochicalco
Xochipila
Xochitecatl
Xpujil
Xtobo
Xul
Xupa
Yaaxhom
Yagul
Yakalmai
Yalcabakal
Yaxche-Xlabpak
Yaxchilan
Yaxcopoil
Yaxuna
Yo'okop
Yucuita
Yula
Zaachila
El Zapotal
Zazacatla
Zohapilco

Micronesia
 Nan Madol
 Chuuk

Mongolia
 Khoid Tsenkheriin Agui (Northern Cave of Blue), Paleolithic cave drawings
 Tsagaan Agui (White Cave), Paleolithic cave drawings
 Kharakhorum, capital of the Mongolian Empire

Montenegro 
Municioium S...
See also:Heritage museum Pljevlja

Morocco

 Lixus
 Tamuda
 Volubilis
 Thamusida
 Iulia Valentia Banasa
 Sala Colonia
 Anfa
 Msoura
 Jebel Irhoud
 Ahl al Oughlam
 Thymiaterium
 Taforalt

The Netherlands
 Hunebed

New Zealand
 Albert Park tunnels – World War II civilian air raid shelters sealed in 1946
 Te Wairoa – "The Buried Village", a Maori village buried by volcanic eruption in 1886
 Wairau Bar – rivermouth site of pre-European Maori settlement
 Huriawa Peninsula - Te Pa a Te Wera, Reserve, and archeological sites
 Motutapu Island - Site of many settlements and early Maori manufacturing

Nicaragua

North Macedonia

Ohrid
Stobi
Heraclea Lyncestis
Vardarski Rid
Astibo
Bargala
Scupi
Stibera
Viničko Kale
Veluška Tumba
Tumba Madžari
Trebeništa
Saint Erasmus, Ohrid
Kokino
Estipeon
Bylazora
Bara Tumba
Antique Theatre

Norway
Borg in Lofoten, Viking Age longhouse site
Borre mound cemetery, cemetery from the Merovingian period to the Viking Age
Gokstad ship burial
Oseberg ship burial
Tune ship burial

Pakistan

 Harappa
 Mehrgarh
 Mohenjo-daro
 Taxila
 Mankiala
Lahore Fort
Badshahi Mosque
Sialkot Fort
Ranikot Fort
Takht-i-Bahi
Rohtas Fort
Kot Diji Fort

Palau
 Aimeliik Site

Panama
Monagrillo

Papua New Guinea
Kuk Swamp

Peru

 

Acaray
Aspero
Bandurria
Buena Vista
Cahuachi
Carajía
Caral
Chan Chan
Chankillo
Cerro Sechin
Chavín de Huantar
Choquequirao
Cumbe Mayo
Guitarrero Cave
Las Haldas
Huaca de Coton
Huaca de la Luna
Huaca dos Cabezas
Huaca Huantinamarca
Huaca Mateo Salado
Huaca Palomino
Huaca Prieta
Huaca Rajada
Huaca Rosada
Huaca Santa Catalina
Jiskairumoko
Kuelap
Machu Picchu
Mojeque
Nazca Lines
Ollantaytambo
Pachacamac
Paracas Candelabra
Paramonga
Pakatnamú
Pikillacta
Pikimachay
Písac
Qollmay
Raqch'i
Sacsayhuamán
Sayhuite
Sechin Alto
Sechin Bajo
Sillustani
Sipán
Tambo Colorado
Tambomachay
Túcume
Wamanmarka
Wanuku Pampa
Waqramarka
Wari ruins
Wari Willka
Willkaraqay
Willkawayin
Wiñay Wayna

Philippines

Angono Petroglyphs
Banaue Rice Terraces
Butuan Archeological Sites
Fort Santiago, Manila
Fort Pilar, Zamboanga
Fort San Pedro, Cebu
Intramuros, the Walled City of Manila
Kabayan Mummy Burial Caves, Benguet
Maranao Settlement of Tugaya
Paleolithic Archaeological Sites in the Cagayan Valley
Spanish Colonial Fortifications of the Philippines
Sagada, Mountain Province
Tabon Caves, Palawan

Poland

 Biskupin Iron Age
 Giecz Middle Ages
 Krzemionki Opatowskie Neolith
 Odry Iron Age
 Ostrów Lednicki Middle Ages
 Otalążka near Grójec, possibly cult-related

Portugal

Abul
Cabeço do Vouga
Castro do Vieito
Cemitério das Âncoras
Muge Mesolithic Shell Middens
Tróia
Vila Nova de São Pedro
Lapedo Child

Qatar

Al Da'asa
Al Khor Island
Jebel Jassassiyeh
Murwab
Ruwayda
Umm Al Maa 
Wadi Debayan

Romania

 Acidava (Enoşeşti) – Dacian, Roman
 Apulon (Piatra Craivii) – Dacian
 Apulum (Alba Iulia) – Roman, Dacian
 Argedava (Popeşti) – Dacian, possibly Burebista's court or capital
 Argidava (Vărădia) – Dacian, Roman
 Basarabi (Calafat) – Basarabi culture (8th – 7th centuries BC), related to Hallstatt culture
 Callatis (Mangalia) – Greek colony
 Capidava – Dacian, Roman
 Cernavodă – Cernavodă culture, Dacian
 Coasta lui Damian (Măerişte)
 Dacian Fortresses of the Orăştie Mountains
 Drobeta – Roman
 Giurtelecu Şimleului
 Histria – Greek colony
 Lumea Noua (near Alba Iulia) –  middle Neolithic to Chalcolithic
 Măgura Uroiului
 Napoca (Cluj-Napoca) – Dacian, Roman
 Peștera cu Oase –  the oldest early modern human remains in Europe
 Porolissum (near Zalău) – Roman
 Potaissa (Turda) – Roman
 Sarmizegetusa Regia – Dacian capital
 Sarmizegetusa Ulpia Traiana – Roman capital of province of Dacia
 Trophaeum Traiani/Civitas Tropaensium (Adamclisi) – Roman
 Tomis (Constanţa) – Greek colony
 Ziridava/Şanţul Mare (Pecica) – Dacian, Pecica culture, 16 archaeological horizons have been distinguished, starting with the Neolithic and ending with the Feudal Age

Russia

Arkaim – Proto-Aryans
Ignateva Cave – Site of Paleolithic cave painting
Ipatovo – Proto-Indo-Europeans
Krivoye Lake – Proto-Aryans
Ladoga – Vikings/Russians
Maykop – Proto-Indo-Europeans
Pazyryk – Scythians
Phanagoria – Ancient Greeks
Sarkel – Khazars
Sintashta – Proto-Aryans
Tanais – Ancient Greeks
Tmutarakan – Greeks/Khazars/Russians
Ubsunur Hollow – nomadic tribes such as the Scythians, the Turks and the Huns
Veliky Novgorod – Vikings/Russians

Serbia
See also: Archaeological sites in Serbia

Čurug
Gamzigrad-Felix Romuliana (Zaječar)
Horreum Margi (Ćuprija)
Justiniana Prima (Mala Kopasnica)
Kalemegdan (Belgrade)
Lepenski Vir (Donji Milanovac)
Mediana (Niš)
Naissus (Niš)
Petrovaradin Fortress
Pločnik
Remesiana (Bela Palanka)
Risovačka Cave (Aranđelovac)
Rudna Glava
Singidunum (Belgrade)
Sirmium (Sremska Mitrovica)
Starčevo
Taliata (Donji Milanovac)
Taurunum (Zemun)
Tašmajdan Park
Trajan's Bridge
Timacum Minus (Knjaževac)
Viminacium (Kostolac)
Ulpiana

Saudi Arabia

Mada'in Saleh
Dumat Al-Jandal
Marid Castle
Tayma
Diriyah
Al-Balad, Jeddah
Dosariyah
Gerrha
Pharaonic Tayma inscription
Tomb of Eve
Qaryat al-Faw
Tarout Island
Thaj
Al-Shuwayḥaṭiyah
Al-Ukhdūd
Rock Art in the Ha'il Region
Al-Rabadha
Bir Hima Rock Petroglyphs and Inscriptions
Al-'Ula
Midian
Thee Ain
Souk Okaz

Slovakia
:Category:Archaeological sites in Slovakia

Somalia 
Surud mountain 
Gelweyto
Laasgeel 
Maduna

Slovenia
Ptuj (Roman city Poetovio)
Potok Cave (cave – Neolithic)
Ljubljana Marsh (Bronze Age findings)
Ljubljana (Roman city Emona)
Vrhnika (World's oldest wheel)

South Africa

 Blombos Cave
 Border Cave
 Cango Caves
 Coopers Cave
 Duinefontein
 Gladysvale Cave
 Hoedjiespunt
 Kathu Archaeological Sites
 Klasies River Caves
 Kromdraai fossil site
 Makapansgat
 Mapungubwe
 Motsetsi
 Plovers Lake
 Sterkfontein
 Swartkrans
 Sibudu Cave
 Taung, North West
 Wonderwerk Cave

Spain

 Amaya, fortification
 Arcóbriga
 Baelo Claudia
 Bastida de Totana
 Bilbilis (Augusta Bilbilis)
 Calafell
 Cancho Roano
 Carthago Nova
 Castulo
 Cave of Altamira
 Cave of La Pasiega
 Caves of Valeron
 Chao Samartín
 Dolmen of Menga
 El Argar
 El Carambolo
 El Maipés Necropolis
 Empúries
 Gavà Prehistoric Mines
 Italica
 Lancia
 Las Cogotas, castro.
 Las Médulas
 Los Millares
 Marroquines Bajos
 Medina Azahara
 Monte Bernorio
 Motilla de Azuer
 Numancia
 Olèrdola
 Painted Cave, Galdar
 Pancorbo, castillo.
 Pozo Moro
 Qart Hadasht
 Recópolis
 Salinas Espartinas
 Talayotic sites
 Tarraco
 Tito Bustillo Cave
 Torralba and Ambrona
 Turuñuelo de Guareña
 Ullastret
 Villa de la Olmeda
 Vascos, medīna

Sri Lanka

Abhayagiri vihāra
Anuradhapura
Avukana Buddha statue
Belilena
Buduruvagala
Deegavapi Raja Maha Viharaya
Dematamal viharaya
Fa Hien Cave
Gal Vihara
Godavaya
Hunugalagala Limestone Cave
Kaludiya Pokuna Forest
Maligawila
Polonnaruwa
Rajagala
Sigiriya
Thanthirimale
Waulpane
Yudaganawa

Sultanate of Oman

Abayah Wadi Suq graves
al-Akhdhar settlement and burial area
al-Amqat Early and Late Iron Age burial ground
al-Batin 1 Late Iron Age burials
al-Bustan burial ground
al-Feg, Siya, W. Sarin Early and Late Iron Age cemetery
al-Jawabi trilith site
al-Moyassar multi-period graves, settlement, copper production
al-Nejd, Sultanate of Oman Late Iron Age fortified settlement
al-Raki settlement and copper production
al-Rustaq, al- multi-period settlement and burial area
al-Salayli, multi-period burial and metal-producing site
al-Saruj Late Iron Age grave
al-Shariq 2 trilith site
al-Wasit Late Bronze Age settlement and burial area
Amla/al-Fuwaydah Pre-Islamic recent period burial ground
Bandar Jissa 1 Late Iron Age cemetery
Bawshar settlement and burial area
Bimmah Early Iron Age settlement and cemetery
Hamra Kahf Late Iron Age graves
Ibra I052 Late Iron Age fortified settlement
Ibri/Selme tombs, Early Iron Age metal hoard
Izki settlement and burial area
Jebel al-Hammah, trilith site
Jebel Sunsunah Late Iron Age fortified settlement
Khadhra Bani Daffa Mustagh Late Iron Age cemetery
Khor Rori 1st century CE Hadhramaut fortified settlement
Lizq fortified mountain Early Iron Age settlement
Mahaliya multi-period pre-Islamic cemeteries
Muscat Christian burials
Muti, Tawi al-Alayah Late Iron Age cemetery
Mudhmar Early Iron Age sanctuary
Negda Madirah Late Iron Age fortified settlement
Qaryat al-Saiḥ Late Iron Age and Muslim period fortified settlement, graves
Ras al-Hadd multi-period settlement and burial area
Ras al-Jins multi-period settlement and burial area
Sabt Saite Early and Late Iron Age graves and fort
Samad al-Shan multi-period settlement, cemetery
Samail, al-Baruni 1 Pre-Islamic recent period burial
Sinaw SNW1 T58 Late Iron Age graves
Suhar Early and Late Iron Age settlement and cemeteries
Shenah Late Iron Age cemetery, possible trilith
Shir Bronze Age burial ground
Tiwi tw0002 Late Iron Age fortified settlement
ʿUmq al-Rabaḫ Late Iron Age settlement and burial area
ʿUqdat al-Bakrah Early Iron Age metal-working site
Wadi Sahtan rock art and inscriptions
Yanqul multi period burials
Yiti Wadi Suq burials

Sweden

Adelsö
Alby
Birka
Gamla Uppsala
Gene fornby
Helgö
Sigtuna
Uppåkra
Valsgärde
Vasa (ship)
Vendel

Switzerland

 Augusta Raurica
 Aventicum (Avenches)
 La Tène, Iron Age
 Vindonissa (Windisch)

Syria

Al-Rawda
Apamea
Bosra
Chagar Bazar
Dibsi Faraj
Ebla
Halabiye
Mari
Mureybet
Palmyra
Qatna
Tell Abu Hureyra
Tell Arbid
Tell Barri
Tell Beydar
Tell Brak
Tell Chuera
Tell Fray
Tell Halaf
Tell Hamoukar
Tell Kashkashok
Tell Leilan
Tell Mozan
Ugarit
Zalabiye

Tanzania
Kilwa Kisiwani
Olduvai Gorge

Taiwan

 Beinan Cultural Park
 Dulan Site
 Fengbitou Archaeological Site
 Huilai Monument Archaeology Park
 Niumatou Site

Thailand
Ban Chiang
Ban Non Wat
Ayutthaya Historical Park

Tunisia 

ad-turres (byzacena) 
Aeliae 
Aptuca
Aquae in Byzacena 
Aquae Regiae 
Ausafa 
Autenti 
Auzegera 
Beni Otsmane 
Bennefa 
Bir-Abdallah
Borj Gourbata 
Botriana 
Cabarsussi 
Carthage
Cebarades 
Chemtou 
Chusira 
Crepedula 
Cufruta 
Culusi 
Douela 
Drâa-Bellouan 
Dzemda 
Edistiana 
Egnatia, Byzacena 
El Brij, Tunisia 
El Kenissia 
El-Haria 
Eles, Tunisia 
enfidha 
Feradi Minus 
Filaca 
Foratiana 
Gratiana, Africa 
Henchir-Bir-El-Menadla 
Henchir Chigarnia 
Henchir-Sidi-Salah 
Henchir-Boucha

Turkey

 Aegospotami
 Aigai (Aeolian)
 Aizanoi
 Akalissos
 Akdamar Island
 Akhisar
 Alabanda
 Alaca Höyük
 Alahan Monastery
 Alalakh
 Alexandria ad Issum
 Alexandria Troas
 Alinda (Caria)
 Alişar Hüyük
 Allianoi
 Altıntepe
 Amida (Roman city)
 Amorium
 Amos (ancient city)
 Amuk, Antakya
 Amyzon
 Anastasian Wall
 Anazarbus
 Anemurium
 Ani
 Antandrus
 Antigonia (Syria)
 Antioch
 Antioch on the Maeander
 Antioch, Pisidia
 Antiochia Lamotis
 Antiochia ad Cragum
 Antiochia ad Pyramum
 Antiochia ad Taurum
 Antiochia, Lydia
 Antiphellus
 Apamea (Euphrates)
 Apamea (Phrygia)
 Apamea Myrlea
 Aphrodisias
 Aphrodisias of Cilicia
 Apollon Lermenos
 Apollonia ad Rhyndacum
 Apollonia (Mysia)
 Apollonia Salbace
 Apros
 Arap Mosque
 Ariassos
 Arslantepe
 Arycanda
 Arzashkun
 Arzawa
 Aspendos
 Assos
 Atarneus
 Attalia
 Attuda
 Aytap
 Basilinopolis
 Balboura
 Beşparmak Mountains
 Beycesultan
 Blaundos
 Bybassios
Cape Gelidonya
 Carchemish
 Cardia (Thrace)
 Caryanda
 Cebrene
 Celaenae
 Cennet and Cehennem
 Ceramus
 Chalcedon
 Cius
 Claudiopolis
 Claros
 Cleopatra's Gate
 Colophon (city)
 Colossae
 Comana (Cappadocia)
 Comana Pontica
 Coracesium
 Corycus
 Cremna, Pisidia
 Cyrrhus, Turkey
 Cyaneae
 Cyme (Aeolis)
 Cyzicus
 Çatalhöyük Neolithic
 Çayönü
 Derbe
 Digda
 Didyma
 Diokaisarea
 Docimium
 Doliche Gaziantep
 Dolichiste
 Domuztepe
 Dorylaeum
 Drusipara
 Edessa, Mesopotamia
 Eflatun Pınar
 Ephesus
 Elaiussa Sebaste
 Emirdağ
 Epiphania, Cilicia
 Erythrae
 Euchaita
 Eumeneia
 Euromus
 Faustinopolis
 Gagae
 Gambrion
 Gangra
 Germanicia Caesarea
 Germanicopolis (Bithynia)
 Göbekli Tepe PPN A
 Gözlükule
 Gordium
 Gümüşler Monastery
 Gryneion
 Hacilar
 Halicarnassus
 Hamaxitus
 Harran
 Hasankeyf
 Hattusa
 Herakleia Salbace
 Hierapolis
 House of the Virgin Mary
 Hoşap Castle
 Hüseyindede Tepe
 Iasos
 Idyma
 Ibora
 Iopolis
 Irenopolis
 Isinda
 Ivriz
 Hattusa
 Heraclea Cybistra
 Kadirli
 Kaman-Kalehöyük
 Karatepe
 Karaman
 Karatepe
 Kaunos
 Kayaköy
 Kelenderis
 Kemalpaşa
 Kerkenes
 Kestel
 Kibyra (Cibyra)
 Kizzuwatna
 Klazomenai
 Knidos
 Koloneia in Cappadocia
 Korydalla
 Kussara
 Kültepe
 Kuşaklı
 Kuştul Monastery
 Labraunda
 Lagina
 Laodicea Combusta
 Laodicea on the Lycus
 Lebedus
 Letoon
 Libyssa
 Limantepe
 Limyra
 Loryma
 Lystra
 Lysimachia (Thrace)
 Magnesia on the Maeander
 Mallus
 Mamure Castle
 Metropolis (Anatolia)
 Miletus
 Mokissos
 Mopsuestia
 Mount Chimaera
 Mount Nemrut
 Myndus
 Myra
 Myriandus
 Myus
 Nagidos
 Nerik
 Nevali Cori PPN A
 Nicomedeia
 Nicopolis (Pontus)
 Notion (ancient city)
 Nysa (Caria)
 Nyssa (Cappadocia)
 Olba (ancient city)
 Olympos
 Oenoanda
 Orestias
 Panionium
 Patara
 Pednelissus, Pisidia
 Pepuza
 Perga
 Pergamon
 Perperene
 Pessinus
 Phaselis
 Phellus
 Phocaea
 Pinara
 Pınarbaşı Gölü
 Pitane (Aeolis)
 Podalia
 Pompeiopolis
 Priene
 Purushanda
 Rhodiopolis
 Rhosus
 Rusahinili
 Sagalassos
 Sakçagözü
 Salatiwara
 Salmydessos
 Sam'al
 Samosata
 Samuha
 Sapinuwa
 Sardis
 Sareisa
 Seleucia (Pamphylia)
 Seleucia Pieria
 Seleucia Sidera
 Selge, Pisidia
 Sesamos, Amestris
 Sestos
 Severan Bridge
 Side
 Sigeion
 Sillyon
 Simena
 Sidyma
 Skepsis
 Smyrna
 Sogmatar
 Soli, Cilicia
 Sozopolis, Pisidia
 St. Nicholas Island
 Stratonicea (Caria)
 Stratonicea (Lydia)
 Sugunia
 Sulusaray
 Sultantepe
 Sümela Monastery
 Syedra
 Tabae
 Tarsus, Mersin
 Tavium
 Tell Tayinat
 Telmessos
 Temnos
 Teos
 Termessos
 Thyatira
 Tille
 Tlos
 Toprakkale
 Tralleis
 Tripolis (Phrygia)
 Trocmades
 Troy Neolithic to Byzantine
 Trysa
 Tushhan
 Tushpa
 Tyana
 Tymbrianassus
 Tymion
 Great Mosque of Diyarbakır (Diyarbakır Ulu Camii)
 Van Fortress
 Xanthos
 Yazılıkaya
 Yenikapı
 Yeşilova Höyük
 Yumuktepe
 Zaliches
 Zelitis
 Zeugma
 Zincirli

Turkmenistan
 Altyndepe
 Anau-depe
 Berdysyčran-depe
 Gonur Tepe
 Jeitun
 Merv
 Monjukli Depe
 Namazga-Tepe
 Togolok
 Ulug Depe
 Yaz-depe

Ukraine

Berezan Island
Bilche Zolote
Chersonesos
Maydanets
Nymphaion
Olbia
Panticapaeum
Shypyntsi
Talianki
Trypillia

United Arab Emirates

 Al-Ashoosh
 Al Madam
 Al Sufouh
 Bidaa bint Saud
 Bithnah
 Ed-Dur
 Hili
 Jebel Buhais
 Jebel Faya
 Jebel Hafeet
 Jumayra
 Kalba
 Masafi
 Mleiha
 Muweilah
 Qattara Oasis
 Rumailah
 Saruq Al Hadid
 Seih Al Harf
 Shimal
 Tell Abraq
 Thuqeibah
 Umm Al-Nar

United Kingdom

Arras
Avebury
Bignor
Burton Fleming
Caerleon
Callanish
Calleva Atrebatum
Castell Henllys
Chedworth Roman Villa
Chew Stoke
Chysauster Ancient Village
Cladh Hallan
Dan y Coed
Danebury
Danes Graves
Duggleby Howe
Eildon Hill
Emain Macha
Fishbourne
Flag Fen
Fountains Abbey
Gough's Cave
Grimes Graves
Hadrian's Wall
Hen Domen
Herscha Hill
Inchmarnock
Ironbridge
Jorvik Viking Centre
Kirkstall Abbey
Little Woodbury
Lullingstone
Maeshowe
Maiden Castle, Dorset
Mine Howe
Mother Grundy's Parlour
Nempnett Thrubwell
Newbridge chariot, Edinburgh
Normanton Down
Paviland Cave
Perceton, North Ayrshire, Medieval Manor
Pixie's Hole
Quanterness
Ring of Brodgar
Seahenge
Silbury Hill
Silchester
Skara Brae
Stanton Drew
Star Carr
Stonehenge
Sutton Hoo
Trelech
Trimontium
Ulva
Verreville Glass and Pottery Works, Glasgow
Verulamium
Vindolanda
Wetwang Slack
Windmill Hill
Woodhenge
Wroxeter
Yeavering
York

England 
Archaeological sites in England

Scotland 
Archaeological sites in Scotland

Wales 
Archaeological sites in Wales

United States
See also: Archaeological sites in the United States by State, List of Mississippian sites, List of Hopewell sites

Accokeek Creek
Angel Mounds 
Aztalan 
Barton Gulch 
Brunswick Town Historic District
Blackwater Draw 
Blood Run Site 
Blythe Intaglios 
Bottle Creek Indian Mounds 
Burton Mound 
Caddo Mounds
Cahawba 
Cahokia
Calico Early Man Site 
Casa Grande 
Castle Hill in Sitka, Alaska
Center for American Archeology, Koster Site 
Chaco Canyon 
Chucalissa, in Memphis, TN
Clary Ranch 
Crystal River in Crystal River, Florida
Effigy Mounds National Monument
El Cuartelejo 
Etowah Mounds
Etzanoa 
Ganondagan State Historic Site 
Gault site 
Grand Village of the Illinois 
Grand Village of the Natchez 
Grave Creek Mound
Gungywamp in Groton, Connecticut
Gunston Hall
Mound City Group
Hovenweep
Jamestown, Virginia
Kincaid Mounds State Historic Site
Knife River Indian Villages
LSU Campus Mounds
Lubbock Lake Landmark
Meadowcroft Rockshelter
Mesa Verde
Miami Circle
Minong Mine Historic District
Mitchell Site
Mound Key
Moundville
Newark Earthworks
Nocoroco
Ocmulgee Mounds
Osage Village
Ozette
Parkin site
Pecos Pueblo
Poverty Point
Pueblo Grande Ruin and Irrigation Sites
Pueblo Grande de Nevada
Pumpkin Creek Site
Sacred Ridge
Serpent Mound
Snaketown
Slack Farm
Spiro Mounds
St. Mary's City, Maryland
Tibes Indigenous Ceremonial Center, in Ponce, Puerto Rico
Toltec Mounds
Topper site in Allendale, South Carolina
Town Creek Indian Mound
Troyville Earthworks
Watson Brake
Wickliffe Mounds
Windover site
Williamsburg
Whydah Gally, site of extensive underwater archaeology
Winterville site

Uzbekistan
Bukhara
Samarkand

Yemen
Ma'rib Capital of the Sabaean empire
Zafar Capital of the Himyarite empire

Zimbabwe
Great Zimbabwe
Ziwa
Matopos

References

The Times 2001, Archaeology of the World, Edited by Chris Scarre, HarperCollins Publishers, London.

Other historical lists

New7Wonders of the World
List of Ancient Settlements in the UAE
List of archaeoastronomical sites by country
List of colossal sculpture in situ
List of Egyptian pyramids
List of largest domes
List of megalithic sites
List of Mesoamerican pyramids
List of Roman domes
List of tallest statues

External links
The World Monuments Fund's Watch List of the 100 Most Endangered Sites
Fasti Online – an online database of archaeological sites

Archaeological sites
Archaeological sites by country